Nahalat Yitzhak is a neighborhood of Tel Aviv, Israel.

Name
Nahalat Yitzhak literally means "Yitzhak's Estate" in Hebrew. The neighborhood is named after Rabbi Yitzchak Elchanan Spektor, Chief Rabbi of Kovno, who wrote a book called Nachal Yitzchok (River of Yitzchok).

History
Nahalat Yitzhak was founded in 1925, east of the Ayalon River, by a group of Jews who came from Kaunas (Kovno), Lithuania.

In 1931 the neighborhood had 36 houses and a population of 134 people. It was established on the border of the German Colony Sarona, adjacent to the Borochov neighborhood, the first neighborhood of Giv'atayim. At the beginning it was a farming neighborhood of homesteads. Later a number of industrial plants were built on the neighborhood's outskirts, among them "Tara Dairies", "Yitzhar" factory (the area where Tel Aviv Towers stand), and a number of flour mills.

Nahalat Yitzhak became part of Tel Aviv on 10 January 1946. In 1958 the interior minister annexed the neighborhood to Giv'atayim, but the Israel Supreme Court reversed the decision after it became clear that the position of opponents of the annexation were not heard, and the neighborhood remained in the jurisdiction of Tel Aviv.

See also
 Nahala (disambiguation page), Hebrew word for heritage or estate widely used for toponyms in Israel
 Nahalat Yitzhak Cemetery

References

Neighborhoods of Tel Aviv
Lithuanian-Jewish culture in Israel